In algebraic topology, given a fibration p:E→B, the change of fiber is a map between the fibers induced by paths in B.

Since a covering is a fibration, the construction generalizes the corresponding facts in the theory of covering spaces.

Definition 
If β is a path in B that starts at, say, b, then we have the homotopy  where the first map is a projection. We have:
.
(There might be an ambiguity and so  need not be well-defined.)

Let  denote the set of path classes in B. We claim that the construction determines the map:
 the set of homotopy classes of maps.
Suppose β, β' are in the same path class; thus, there is a homotopy h from β to β'. Let
.
Drawing a picture, there is a homeomorphism  that restricts to a homeomorphism .

In particular, we have , establishing the claim.

It is clear from the construction that the map is a homomorphism: if ,

where  is the constant path at b. It follows that  has inverse. Hence, we can actually say:
 the set of homotopy classes of homotopy equivalences.
Also, we have: for each b in B,
 { [ƒ] | homotopy equivalence  }
which is a group homomorphism (the right-hand side is clearly a group.) In other words, the fundamental group of B at b acts on the fiber over b, up to homotopy. This fact is a useful substitute for the absence of the structure group.

Consequence 
One consequence of the construction is the below:
The fibers of p over a path-component is homotopy equivalent to each other.

References 
James F. Davis, Paul Kirk, Lecture Notes in Algebraic Topology
May, J. A Concise Course in Algebraic Topology

Algebraic topology